Rondoy (possibly from Quechua runtuy: "to hail" or "to lay an egg") is a  mountain in the north of the Huayhuash mountain range in the Andes of Peru. It is located in the Ancash Region, Bolognesi Province, Pacllón District, and in the Huánuco Region, Lauricocha Province, Queropalca District. Rondoy lies north of Yerupajá and Jirishanca and southwest of Lake Mitococha.

See also 

Lake Niñacocha
Lake Carhuacocha
 Rasac

References

Mountains of Peru
Mountains of Ancash Region
Mountains of Huánuco Region